is a railway station in the city of Tokoname, Aichi, Japan, operated by Meitetsu.

Lines

Station layout
The station has two opposed side platforms connected by a footbridge. The station has automated ticket machines, Manaca automated turnstiles and it is unattended.

Platforms

Adjacent stations

Station history
It was renamed to its present name before 1920. The Aichi Electric Railway became part of the Meitetsu group on August 1, 1935. In January 2005, the Tranpass system of magnetic fare cards with automatic turnstiles was implemented.

Passenger statistics
In fiscal 2016, the station was used by an average of 2,421 passengers daily (boarding passengers only).

Surrounding area
Sainen-ji
Ōno beach

See also
 List of Railway Stations in Japan

References

External links

 Official web page 

Railway stations in Japan opened in 1912
Railway stations in Aichi Prefecture
Stations of Nagoya Railroad
Tokoname